Newell Township is a township in Vermilion County, Illinois, USA.  As of the 2010 census, its population was 13,969 and it contained 6,768 housing units.

History
The first sale of land in this area was in 1824 to Obadiah Le Neve, who settled here just before Christmas of that year.  It was not until 1851 that the county was divided up into its first eight townships, and Newell Township was one of those.  It was named for Squire James Newell, the first Justice of the Peace for the area.

Geography
The township contains much of Lake Vermilion.

Cities and towns
 Bismarck
 Danville (the county seat) (north portion)

Unincorporated towns
 Illiana

Extinct towns
 Campbell
 Denmark
 Myersville
 Newell
 West Newell

Adjacent townships
 Kent Township, Warren County, Indiana (east)
 Steuben Township, Warren County, Indiana (east)
 Mound Township, Warren County, Indiana (southeast)
 Danville Township (south)
 Blount Township (west)
 South Ross Township (northwest)

Cemeteries
The township contains these cemeteries:  Bryley, Farmers Chapel, Huffman, Lamb, Leonard, Rose, Springhill, Sunset Memorial and Walnut Corner.

Major highways
  U.S. Route 136
  Illinois State Route 1

Airports and landing strips
 Vermilion County Airport

Demographics

References
 U.S. Board on Geographic Names (GNIS)
 United States Census Bureau cartographic boundary files

External links
 US-Counties.com
 City-Data.com
 Illinois State Archives

Townships in Vermilion County, Illinois
Townships in Illinois